Sanna-Leena Perunka (born 23 September 1976) is a Finnish biathlete. She competed in four events at the 2002 Winter Olympics.

References

External links
 

1976 births
Living people
Biathletes at the 2002 Winter Olympics
Finnish female biathletes
Olympic biathletes of Finland
Place of birth missing (living people)